Lindenhurst is a village in Lake County, Illinois, United States. Per the 2020 census, the population was 14,406. Lindenhurst lies within Lake Villa Township.

History

The Village of Lindenhurst lies within the Valparaiso moraine from the most recent Ice Age. The area is rich in lakes and swamp land; it was inhabited by the Potawatomi Indian tribe, who mixed agriculture with hunting and fishing. The rich soil ultimately attracted European farmers. An expedition led by Colbee Benton in the 1830s was followed by treaties by which the Potawatomi, the Sauk and the Blackhawk Tribes agreed to leave the area. Most Euro-American settlers came from the east coast, the first recorded being the Pennsylvanian Noer Potter. There were also a number of early Scottish, German and English arrivals.

Incorporation papers for Lindenhurst were filed in November 1956 with Lake County Judge Minard Hulse. The first village officials were elected in a December 1956 election, with 90% voter turnout. The village was incorporated on January 16, 1957.

The first village president was Lee R. Lewis, and meetings were held on Saturdays to accommodate the commuting members of the board and community. The first meeting was held in the home of trustee Helen Skelton. Another election – mandated by law – was held in April 1957, and Robert Randall was elected the new president. The board held fundraisers like dances to purchase such things as stationery and record books. After his first year in office, President Randall reflected on the successes: ordinances and zoning laws had been passed, roads were being graded, snow removed, and police were patrolling the village. Running water from a tower near Fairfield Road and Hawthorne Drive arrived in the late 1950s.

The village population was now 1,000.

Incorporation

Housing 
The village of Lindenhurst grew out of the farm of a wealthy landowner in northern Illinois. The Ernst E. Lehmann farm, known as Lindenhurst, was acquired by developer Morton "Mort" Engle, who bought it from Lehmann family friend Edna Siebel. The name Lindenhurst came from the two rows of linden trees outlining the original farmhouse. Engle subdivided the  farm in 1952, and in 1953, the first homes were built behind what is now Linden Plaza. Engle Homes at the time cost $12,000–$15,000, roof extra. "The idyllic family homes of Lindenhurst offered the perfect solution for a home-hungry nation," states local historian Joseph Brysiewicz. In 1961, Ted Flanagan was elected mayor, and 200 houses were being built each year, under the control of Engle.

Education 
The first school was completed in September 1958. Built on land from the Howard Bonner farm and redistricted from the Millburn school district to Lake Villa District 41, the school was named B.J. Hooper School after District 41 school board president and prominent Lake Villa citizen B.J. Hooper.

Business Development 
Lindenhurst's first business, Thor's Shell, stood at the intersection of Grand Avenue and Lindenhurst Drive. By 1960, the first major commercial development in Lindenhurst was the building of Linden Plaza, featuring Slove Bakery, Village Laundry, Linden Cleaners, and Piggly Wiggly. Other businesses established in Lindenhurst included Linden Texaco, Linden Barber Shop, Ben Franklin Variety Store, and Stretch-A-Dollar Clothing Store. The Lindenhurst Civic Center built its own facility in 1961 using the remains of the original Lindenhurst Farm ice house to anchor its building. It served as a meeting place for groups and organizations, card parties, socials, polling place, wedding receptions and family reunions. A school for the old Lindenhurst farm served as Village Hall until it burned down, and the offices moved to Linden Plaza. By 1970, the village numbered 3,141 people. The village offices couldn't be crammed into Linden Plaza any longer, and the new village hall that was built in 1974 housed office space, the mayor, the police department, the building inspector, and the village garage.

Public Safety 
The Lindenhurst police force was all-volunteer at first, buying their own uniforms and using their own cars; fundraisers were held to pay for salaries and a patrol car. A full-time police position was created in 1963, and the village acquired a reputation as a "speed trap", due to radar use by the police. Lindenhurst became front-page headline material on November 27, 2006, when the village's first homicide in over nine years took place. A Burger King manager was killed in an apparent robbery at the national fast-food chain's Lindenhurst franchise.

In  1965, the village created its first sanitary district, replacing individual septic systems with a sewer system. Streets were paved and gutters installed during this period as well. Ted Flanagan was reelected mayor in 1969 and served until 1983.

Community 
Besides the village's 25th anniversary, the 1980s brought the village, cable TV access, fast food, and a budget of $1.5 million. Lindenfest was founded by volunteers in 1983. It grew out of tents and booths set up by local clubs and organizations in the village hall parking lot. Today it has a carnival, games, contests, marathons, and music. Other additions to Lindenhurst in recent years include Victory Lakes, the Lindenhurst-Lake Villa Chamber of Commerce, and the Lindenhurst Park District.

The population in 1990 was 8,044 and is over 14,000 today. In a 1999 Lake Villa and Lindenhurst Review article, Village Administrator James Stevens said that Lindenhurst "has been able to keep the small town flavor, in large part, through selective land annexation, and by carefully choosing developers for high quality but diversified housing types, including single family, town homes and condominiums. And all the housing types have to be integrated with the lakes, marshes, open space and forested areas of the village." The Lindenhurst motto is "Developing Today for Tomorrow".

Geography
Lindenhurst is located at  (42.41053, -88.02624).

Lindenhurst's first stop light was erected at Grand Avenue and Sand Lake Road in the 1980s.

Major streets
 
  Grand Avenue
 Grass Lake Road
 Savage Road
 Gelden Road
 Deep Lake Road
 Granada Boulevard
 Sand Lake Road
 Beck Road

Demographics

2020 census

Note: the US Census treats Hispanic/Latino as an ethnic category. This table excludes Latinos from the racial categories and assigns them to a separate category. Hispanics/Latinos can be of any race.

2000 Census
As of the census of 2010, there were 14,462 people residing in the village. The racial makeup of the village was 88.8% White, 2.4% African American, 0.2% Native American, 4.5% Asian, and 2.1% from two or more races. Hispanic or Latino of any race were 6.8% of the population.

As of the census of 2000, there were 12,539 people, 4,235 households, and 3,472 families residing in the village. The racial makeup of the village was 92.83% White, 1.47% African American, 0.15% Native American, 3.01% Asian, 0.01% Pacific Islander, 1.32% from other races, and 1.22% from two or more races. Hispanic or Latino of any race were 4.05% of the population.

There were 4,235 households, out of which 45.3% had children under the age of 18 living with them, 74.3% were married couples living together, 5.2% had a female householder with no husband present, and 18.0% were non-families. 14.2% of all households were made up of individuals, and 4.4% had someone living alone who was 65 years of age or older. The average household size was 2.93 and the average family size was 3.27.

In the village the population was spread out, with 30.3% under the age of 18, 5.8% from 18 to 24, 37.3% from 25 to 44, 19.8% from 45 to 64, and 6.7% who were 65 years of age or older. The median age was 34 years. For every 100 females, there were 97.4 males. For every 100 females age 18 and over, there were 94.9 males.

The median income for a household in the village was $74,841, and the median income for a family was $78,271. Males had a median income of $54,167 versus $33,935 for females. The per capita income for the village was $27,534. About 1.1% of families and 1.6% of the population were below the poverty line, including 2.2% of those under age 18 and 2.6% of those age 65 or over.

References

External links

Village of Lindenhurst

Villages in Illinois
Villages in Lake County, Illinois
Populated places established in 1953